Tetzlaff is a surname. It is a German rendering of a West Slavic personal name. The surname may refer to:

 Christian Tetzlaff (born 1966), German violinist, brother of Tanja
 Dale H. "Ted" Tetzlaff (1903–1995), American cinematographer
 Doris Tetzlaff (1921–1998), American baseball player
 Dörthe Tetzlaff, German geologist
 Percy Tetzlaff (1920–2009), New Zealand rugby player
 Rob Tetzlaff (1935–2012), American Olympic cyclist
 Tanja Tetzlaff (born 1973), German cellist, sister of Christian
 Teddy Tetzlaff (1883–1929), American racecar driver
 Toni Tetzlaff (1871–1947), German actress
 Walter Tetzlaff (1915–1975), American child actor

See also
Tetzlaff Peak, a mountain in Utah, US
Tetzlav (before 1163 – between 1170 and 1181), Prince of Rügen

German-language surnames
West Slavic-language surnames